Radoald (also Raduald) (died 647) was the duke of Benevento (the southernmost Lombard duchy in medieval Italy) from 642 to his death in 647. His elder brother, Aiulf, was mentally unstable and Radoald and their younger brother Grimoald served as regents. Radoald and Grimoald were brothers and younger sons of Gisulf II of Friuli and Romilda of Friuli. They were adopted sons of Arechis I of Benevento, of whom Aiulf was a natural son.

In 642, Slavic plunderers landed near Siponto on the Adriatic. Aiulf personally led his forces against the intruders, but his horse fell into a pit dug by the Slavs around their camp and he was surrounded and killed. Radoald knew the Slavic language and having conversed with them, they lowered their guard; whereupon his forces fell on them with great slaughter, causing them to depart. With the support of King Rothari, Radoald succeeded Aiulf.  

The Romans of Salernum negotiated a truce with Beneventum.

Radoald was succeeded by Grimoald.

References

651 deaths
Dukes of Benevento
Lombard warriors
7th-century Lombard people
7th-century rulers in Europe
Year of birth unknown